Baron Russell of Liverpool, of Liverpool in the County Palatine of Lancaster, is a title in the Peerage of the United Kingdom. It was created in 1919 for Sir Edward Russell. He served as editor of the Liverpool Daily Post for almost fifty years and also briefly represented Glasgow Bridgeton in the House of Commons as a Liberal.

His three sons predeceased him. His grandson, the second Baron, was a prominent lawyer and author who earned the Military Cross in the First World War. As Deputy Judge Advocate General to the British Army of the Rhine he was one of the chief legal advisers during the war crimes trials held in Nuremberg and Tokyo at the end of the Second World War.

, the title is held by his grandson, the third Baron, who succeeded in 1981. He serves as an elected hereditary peer in the House of Lords having been elected at a by election in December 2014. He sits as a Crossbencher.

Barons Russell of Liverpool (1919) and heirs
Edward Richard Russell, 1st Baron Russell of Liverpool (1834–1920)
Hon. Richard Henry Langley Russell (1861–1899), predeceased his father the 1st Baron
Edward Frederick Langley Russell, 2nd Baron Russell of Liverpool (1895–1981)
Captain the Hon. Langley Gordon Haslingden Russell (1922–1975), predeceased his father the 2nd Baron
Simon Gordon Jared Russell, 3rd Baron Russell of Liverpool (b. 1952)

The heir apparent is the present holder's son the Hon. Edward Charles Stanley Russell (b. 1985).

References

Baronies in the Peerage of the United Kingdom
Noble titles created in 1919
Noble titles created for UK MPs